Elit İşcan (born 12 January 1994) is a Turkish actress. Her credits include the film Mustang and the television show Küçük Kadınlar. She has received the IFFI Best Actor Award (Female) at the 46th International Film Festival of India

Life and career
İşcan's father was an architect and her mother was a computer programmer. She has one sibling. She finished her studies at the Istanbul Kemer College. After Reha Erdem's visit to her school, she auditioned for the movie Beş Vakit and was cast in a supporting role, which marked her cinematic debut. With her role in the TV series Küçük Kadınlar she gained popularity. Later in 2008, she appeared in Reha Erdem's movie Hayat Var and portrayed the character Hayat. For this role, she was nominated for Cahide Sonku Best Performance by an Actress Award at the 42nd SİYAD Awards. In 2015, she had a leading role in Deniz Gamze Ergüven's movie Mustang. The film was selected as France's submission, and was nominated for, the Best Foreign Language Film at the 88th Academy Awards.

Filmography

References

External links

1994 births
Living people
Actresses from Istanbul
Turkish film actresses
21st-century Turkish actresses
Turkish child actresses

IFFI Best Actor (Female) winners